This is a list of the bird species recorded in Scotland. The avifauna of Scotland include a total of 535 species, of which 9 have been introduced by humans.

This list's taxonomic treatment (designation and sequence of orders, families and species) and nomenclature (common and scientific names) follow the conventions of British Ornithologists' Union (BOU). The family accounts at the beginning of each heading reflect this taxonomy, as do the species counts found in each family account. Introduced and accidental species are included in the total counts for Scotland.

The following tags have been used to highlight several categories. The commonly occurring native species do not fall into any of these categories.

 (A) Accidental - a species that rarely or accidentally occurs in Scotland
 (I) Introduced - a species introduced to Scotland as a consequence, direct or indirect, of human actions
 (E) Endemic - a species endemic to Scotland

Ducks, geese, and swans
Order: AnseriformesFamily: Anatidae

Anatidae includes the ducks and most duck-like waterfowl, such as geese and swans. These birds are adapted to an aquatic existence with webbed feet, flattened bills, and feathers that are excellent at shedding water due to an oily coating.

 Brent goose, Branta bernicla 
 Red-breasted goose, Branta ruficollis A
 Canada goose, Branta canadensis I
 Barnacle goose, Branta leucopsis 
 Snow goose, Anser caerulescens A
 Greylag goose, Anser anser
 Taiga bean goose, Anser fabalis 
 Tundra bean goose, Anser serrirostris 
 Pink-footed goose, Anser brachyrhynchus
 White-fronted goose, Anser albifrons
 Lesser white-fronted goose, Anser erythropus A 
 Mute swan, Cygnus olor I
 Bewick's swan, Cygnus columbianus
 Whooper swan, Cygnus cygnus  
 Egyptian goose, Aloochen aegyptiaca A
 Shelduck, Tadorna tadorna 
 Ruddy shelduck, Tadorna ferruginea 
 Mandarin duck, Aix galericulata I' 
 Garganey, Spatula querquedula 
 Blue-winged teal, Spatula discors 
 Shoveler, Spatula clypeata 
 Gadwall, Mareca strepera
 Wigeon, Mareca penelope 
 American wigeon, Mareca americana 
 Mallard, Anas platyrhynchos 
 Black duck, Anas rubripes A
 Pintail, Anas acuta
 Teal, Anas crecca 
 Green-winged teal, Anas carolinensis 
 Red-crested pochard, Netta rufina 
 Canvasback, Aythya valisineria A
 Redhead, Aythya americana A
 Pochard, Aythya ferina  
 Ferruginous duck, Aythya nyroca A
 Ring-necked duck, Aythya collaris 
 Tufted duck, Aythya fuligula 
 Scaup, Aythya marila 
 Lesser scaup, Aythya affinis 
 Steller's eider, Polysticta stelleri A
 King eider, Somateria spectabilis 
 Eider, Somateria mollissima 
 Harlequin duck, Histrionicus histrionicus A
 Surf scoter, Melanitta perspicillata A
 Velvet scoter, Melanitta fusca 
 Common scoter, Melanitta nigra 
 Black scoter, Melanitta americana A
 Long-tailed duck, Clangula hyemalis 
 Bufflehead, Bucephala albeola A
 Goldeneye, Bucephala clangula
 Barrow's goldeneye, Bucephala islandica A 
 Smew, Mergellus albellus
 Hooded merganser, Lophodytes cucullatus A 
 Goosander, Mergus merganser 
 Red-breasted merganser, Mergus serrator 
 Ruddy duck, Oxyura jamaicensis I

Pheasants, grouse, and allies
Order: GalliformesFamily: Phasianidae

These are terrestrial species of gamebirds, feeding and nesting on the ground. They are variable in size but generally plump, with broad and relatively short wings.

 Red grouse, Lagopus lagopus A
 Ptarmigan, Lagopus muta 
 Capercaillie, Tetrao urogallus I
 Black grouse, Tetrao tetrix
 Grey partridge, Perdix perdix I
 Lady Amherst's pheasant, Chrysolophus amherstiae I
 Pheasant, Phasianus colchicus I
 Quail, Coturnix coturnix 
 Red-legged partridge, Alectorix rufa I

Nightjars and allies
Order: CaprimulgiformesFamily: Caprimulgidae

Nightjars are medium-sized nocturnal birds that usually nest on the ground. They have long wings, short legs and very short bills. Most have small feet, of little use for walking, and long pointed wings. Their soft plumage is camouflaged to resemble bark or leaves.

 Common nighthawk, Chordeiles minor A
 Nightjar, Caprimulgus europaeus

Swifts
Order: ApodiformesFamily: Apodidae

Swifts are small birds which spend the majority of their lives flying. These birds have very short legs and never settle voluntarily on the ground, perching instead only on vertical surfaces. Many swifts have long swept-back wings which resemble a crescent or boomerang.

 White-throated needletail, Hirundapus caudacutus A
 Chimney swift, Chaetura pelagica A
 Alpine swift, Apus melba A
 Swift, Apus apus 
 Pallid swift, Apus pallidus A
 Pacific swift, Apus pacificus A
 Little swift, Apus affinis A

Bustards
Order: OtidiformesFamily: Otididae

Bustards are large terrestrial birds mainly associated with dry open country and steppes in the Old World. They are omnivorous and nest on the ground. They walk steadily on strong legs and big toes, pecking for food as they go. They have long broad wings with "fingered" wingtips and striking patterns in flight. Many have interesting mating displays.

Great bustard, Otis tarda (A)
Macqueen's bustard, Chlamydotis macqueenii (A)
Little bustard, Tetrax tetrax (A)

Cuckoos
Order: CuculiformesFamily: Cuculidae

The family Cuculidae includes cuckoos, roadrunners and anis. These birds are of variable size with slender bodies, long tails and strong legs. The Old World cuckoos are brood parasites.

Great spotted cuckoo, Clamator glandarius (A)
Yellow-billed cuckoo, Coccyzus americanus (A)
Black-billed cuckoo, Coccyzus erythropthalmus (A)
Cuckoo, Cuculus canorus

Sandgrouse
Order: PterocliformesFamily: Pteroclidae

Sandgrouse have small, pigeon like heads and necks, but sturdy compact bodies. They have long pointed wings and sometimes tails and a fast direct flight. Flocks fly to watering holes at dawn and dusk. Their legs are feathered down to the toes.

Pallas's sandgrouse, Syrrhaptes paradoxus (A)

Pigeons and doves
Order: ColumbiformesFamily: Columbidae

Pigeons and doves are stout-bodied birds with short necks and short slender bills with a fleshy cere.

Rock pigeon, Columba livia
Stock dove, Columba oenas
Woodpigeon, Columba palumbus
Turtle dove, Streptopelia turtur
Oriental turtle dove, Streptopelia orientalis A
Collared dove, Streptopelia decaocto
Mourning dove, Zenaida macroura A

Rails, gallinules, and coots
Order: GruiformesFamily: Rallidae

Rallidae is a large family of small to medium-sized birds which includes the rails, crakes, coots and gallinules. Typically they inhabit dense vegetation in damp environments near lakes, swamps or rivers. In general they are shy and secretive birds, making them difficult to observe. Most species have strong legs and long toes which are well adapted to soft uneven surfaces. They tend to have short, rounded wings and to be weak fliers.

Water rail, Rallus aquaticus
Corncrake, Crex crex 
Sora rail, Porzana carolina (A)
Spotted crake, Porzana porzana
Moorhen, Gallinula chloropus
Coot, Fulica atra
American coot, Fulica americana (A)
Allen's gallinule, Porphyrio alleni (A)
Baillon's crake, Zapornia pusilla (A)
Little crake, Zapornia parva (A)

Cranes
Order: GruiformesFamily: Gruidae

Cranes are large, long-legged and long-necked birds. Unlike the similar-looking but unrelated herons, cranes fly with necks outstretched, not pulled back. Most have elaborate and noisy courting displays or "dances".

Sandhill crane, Antigone canadensis (A)
Crane, Grus grus

Grebes

Order: PodicipediformesFamily: Podicipedidae

Grebes are small to medium-large freshwater diving birds. They have lobed toes and are excellent swimmers and divers. However, they have their feet placed far back on the body, making them quite ungainly on land.

 Little grebe, Tachybaptus ruficollis 
 Pied-billed grebe, Podilymbus podiceps A
 Red-necked grebe, Podiceps grisegena
 Great crested grebe, Podiceps cristatus 
 Slavonian grebe, Podiceps auritus 
 Black-necked grebe, Podiceps nigricollis

Stone-curlews
Order: CharadriiformesFamily: Burhinidae

The stone-curlews are a group of largely tropical waders in the family Burhinidae. They are found worldwide within the tropical zone, with some species also breeding in temperate Europe and Australia. They are medium to large waders with strong black or yellow-black bills, large yellow eyes and cryptic plumage. Despite being classed as waders, most species have a preference for arid or semi-arid habitats.

Stone-curlew, Burhinus oedicnemus A

Oystercatchers
Order: CharadriiformesFamily: Haematopodidae

The oystercatchers are large and noisy plover-like birds, with strong bills used for smashing or prising open molluscs.

Oystercatcher, Haematopus ostralegus

Stilts and avocets
Order: CharadriiformesFamily: Recurvirostridae

Recurvirostridae is a family of large wading birds, which includes the avocets and stilts. The avocets have long legs and long up-curved bills. The stilts have extremely long legs and long, thin, straight bills.

Black-winged stilt, Himantopus himantopus A
Avocet, Recurvirostra avosetta

Plovers and lapwings
Order: CharadriiformesFamily: Charadriidae

The family Charadriidae include the plovers, dotterels and lapwings. They are small to medium-sized birds with compact bodies, short, thick necks and long, usually pointed, wings. They are found in open country worldwide, mostly in habitats near water.

Lapwing, Vanellus vanellus
Sociable plover, Vanellus gregarius (A)
White-tailed plover, Vanellus leucurus (A)
Golden plover, Pluvialis apricaria
Pacific golden plover, Pluvialis fulva 
American golden plover, Pluvialis dominica 
Grey plover, Pluvialis squatarola
Ringed plover, Charadrius hiaticula 
Semipalmated plover, Charadrius semipalmatus (A)
Little ringed plover, Charadrius dubius
Killdeer, Charadrius vociferus (A)
Kentish plover, Charadrius alexandrinus 
Lesser sand plover, Charadrius mongolus (A)
Greater sand plover, Charadrius leschenaultii (A)
Caspian plover, Charadrius asiaticus (A)
Dotterel, Charadrius morinellus

Sandpipers and allies
Order: CharadriiformesFamily: Scolopacidae

Scolopacidae is a large diverse family of small to medium-sized shorebirds including the sandpipers, curlews, godwits, shanks, tattlers, woodcocks, snipes, dowitchers and phalaropes. The majority of these species eat small invertebrates picked out of the mud or soil. Variation in length of legs and bills enables multiple species to feed in the same habitat, particularly on the coast, without direct competition for food.

Upland sandpiper, Bartramia longicauda A
Whimbrel, Numenius phaeopus
Eskimo curlew, Numenius borealis A
Curlew, Numenius arquata
Bar-tailed godwit, Limosa lapponica
Black-tailed godwit, Limosa limosa
Hudsonian godwit, Limosa haemastica A
Turnstone, Arenaria interpres
Great knot, Calidris tenuirostris A
Knot, Calidris canutus
Ruff, Calidris pugnax
Broad-billed sandpiper, Calidris falcinellus A
Sharp-tailed sandpiper, Calidris acuminata A
Stilt sandpiper, Calidris himantopus A
Curlew sandpiper, Calidris ferruginea
Temminck's stint, Calidris temminckii
Long-toed stint, Calidris subminuta A
Red-necked stint, Calidris ruficollis A
Sanderling, Calidris alba
Dunlin, Calidris alpina 
Purple sandpiper, Calidris maritima 
Baird's sandpiper, Calidris bairdii 
Little stint, Calidris minuta 
Least sandpiper, Calidris minutilla A
White-rumped sandpiper, Calidris fuscicollis 
Buff-breasted sandpiper, Calidris subruficollis 
Pectoral sandpiper, Calidris melanotos
Semipalmated sandpiper, Calidris pusilla 
Western sandpiper, Calidris mauri A 
Long-billed dowitcher, Limnodromus scolopaceus A
Short-billed dowitcher, Limnodromus griseus 
Woodcock, Scolopax rusticola
Great snipe, Gallinago media 
Jack snipe, Lymnocryptes minimus 
Snipe, Gallinago gallinago
Wilson's snipe, Gallinago delicata A
Terek sandpiper, Xenus cinereus A
Wilson's phalarope, Phalaropus tricolor 
Red-necked phalarope, Phalaropus lobatus
Grey phalarope, Phalaropus fulicarius 
Common sandpiper, Actitis hypoleucos 
Spotted sandpiper, Actitis macularius 
Green sandpiper, Tringa ochropus
Solitary sandpiper, Tringa solitaria A
Grey-tailed tattler, Tringa brevipes A
Lesser yellowlegs, Tringa flavipes 
Redshank, Tringa totanus
Marsh sandpiper, Tringa stagnatilis A
Wood sandpiper, Tringa glareola
Spotted redshank, Tringa erythropus
Greenshank, Tringa nebularia
Greater yellowlegs, Tringa melanoleuca A

Pratincoles and coursers
Order: CharadriiformesFamily: Glareolidae

Glareolidae is a family of wading birds comprising the pratincoles, which have short legs, long pointed wings, and long forked tails, and the coursers, which have long legs, short wings, and long, pointed bills which curve downwards.

Cream-coloured courser, Cursorius cursor A
Collared pratincole, Glareola pratincola A
Oriental pratincole, Glareola maldivarum A
Black-winged pratincole, Glareola nordmanni A

Gulls terns, and skimmers

Order: CharadriiformesFamily: Laridae

Laridae is a family of medium to large seabirds, the gulls, terns, and skimmers. Gulls are typically grey or white, often with black markings on the head or wings. They have stout, longish bills and webbed feet. Terns are a group of generally medium to large seabirds typically with grey or white plumage, often with black markings on the head. Most terns hunt fish by diving but some pick insects off the surface of fresh water. Terns are generally long-lived birds, with several species known to live in excess of 30 years.

 Kittiwake, Rissa tridactyla 
 Ivory gull, Pagophila eburnea 
 Sabine's gull, Xema sabini
 Bonaparte's gull, Chroicocephalus philadelphia 
 Black-headed gull, Chroicocephalus ridibundus
 Little gull, Hydrocoloeus minutus
 Ross's gull, Rhodostethia rosea 
 Laughing gull, Leucophaeus atricilla 
 Franklin's gull, Leucophaeus pipixcan A
 Audouin's gull, Ichthyaetus audouinii A
 Mediterranean gull, Ichthyaetus melanocephalus 
 Common gull, Larus canus 
 Ring-billed gull, Larus delawarensis 
 Great black-backed gull, Larus marinus 
 Glaucous gull, Larus hyperboreus
 Iceland gull, Larus glaucoides 
 Herring gull, Larus argentatus 
 Caspian gull, Larus cachinnans A
 Yellow-legged gull, Larus michahellis A
 Lesser black-backed gull, Larus fuscus 
 Gull-billed tern, Gelochelidon nilotica A
 Caspian tern, Hydroprogne caspia 
 Royal tern, Thalasseus maximus A 
 Lesser crested tern, Thalasseus bengalensis A
 Sandwich tern, Thalasseus sandvicensis
 Little tern, Sternula albifrons 
 Bridled tern, Onychoprion anaethetus A
 Sooty tern, Onychoprion fuscatus A
 Roseate tern, Sterna dougallii 
 Common tern, Sterna hirundo 
 Arctic tern, Sterna paradisaea
 Forster's tern, Sterna forsteri A
 Whiskered tern, Chlidonias hybrida A
 White-winged black tern, Chlidonias niger A
 Black tern, Chlidonias niger

Skuas and jaegers
Order: CharadriiformesFamily: Stercorariidae

The family Stercorariidae are, in general, medium to large birds, typically with grey or brown plumage, often with white markings on the wings. They nest on the ground in temperate and arctic regions and are long-distance migrants.

Great skua, Stercorarius skua
Pomarine skua, Stercorarius pomarinus
Arctic skua, Stercorarius parasiticus
Long-tailed skua, Stercorarius longicaudus

Auks, murres, and puffins
Order: CharadriiformesFamily: Alcidae

Alcids are superficially similar to penguins due to their black-and-white colours, their upright posture and some of their habits, however they are not related to the penguins and differ in being able to fly. Auks live on the open sea, only deliberately coming ashore to nest.

Little auk, Alle alle
Brünnich’s guillemot, Uria lomvia A
Common guillemot, Uria aalge
Razorbill, Alca torda
Great auk, Pinguinus impennis A Extinct
Black guillemot, Cepphus grylle
Puffin, Fratercula arctica

Divers

Order: GaviiformesFamily: Gaviidae

Loons, known as divers in Europe, are a group of aquatic birds found in many parts of North America and northern Europe. They are the size of a large duck or small goose, which they somewhat resemble when swimming, but to which they are completely unrelated.

 Red-throated diver, Gavia stellata 
 Black-throated diver, Gavia arctica 
 Great northern diver, Gavia immer 
 White-billed diver, Gavia adamsii

Southern storm-petrels

Order: ProcellariiformesFamily: Oceanitidae

The austral storm petrels are relatives of the petrels and are the smallest seabirds. They feed on planktonic crustaceans and small fish picked from the surface, typically while hovering.

 Wilson's petrel, Oceanites oceanicus A
 White-faced storm petrel, Pelagodroma marina A

Albatrosses
Order: ProcellariiformesFamily: Diomedeidae

The albatrosses are among the largest of flying birds, and the great albatrosses from the genus Diomedea have the largest wingspans of any extant birds.

Black-browed albatross, Thalassarche melanophris (A)

Northern storm-petrels
Order: ProcellariiformesFamily: Hydrobatidae

The northern storm-petrels are relatives of the petrels and are the smallest seabirds. They feed on planktonic crustaceans and small fish picked from the surface, typically while hovering. The flight is fluttering and sometimes bat-like.

 Storm petrel, Hydrobates pelagicus 
 Swinhoe's petrel, Hydrobates monorhis A
 Leach's petrel, Hydrobates leucorhoa

Petrels and shearwaters
Order: ProcellariiformesFamily: Procellaridae

The procellariids are the main group of medium-sized "true petrels", characterised by united nostrils with medium septum and a long outer functional primary.

 Fulmar, Fulmarus glacialis 
 Fea's petrel, Pterodroma feae A
 Cory's shearwater, Calonectris diomedea 
 Sooty shearwater, Ardenna griseus
 Great shearwater, Ardenna gravis  
 Manx shearwater, Puffinus puffinus 
 Balearic shearwater, Puffinus mauretanicus 
 Barolo shearwater, Puffinus baroli A

Storks
Order: CiconiiformesFamily: Ciconiidae

Storks are large, long-legged, long-necked, wading birds with long, stout bills. Storks are mute, but bill-clattering is an important mode of communication at the nest. Their nests can be large and may be reused for many years. Many species are migratory..

Black stork, Ciconia nigra A
White stork, Ciconia ciconiaFrigatebirdsOrder: SuliformesFamily: Fregatidae

Frigatebirds are large seabirds usually found over tropical oceans. They are large, black-and-white or completely black, with long wings and deeply forked tails. The males have coloured inflatable throat pouches. They do not swim or walk and cannot take off from a flat surface. Having the largest wingspan-to-body-weight ratio of any bird, they are essentially aerial, able to stay aloft for more than a week.

Ascension frigatebird, Fregata aquila (A)
Magnificent frigatebird, Fregata magnificens (A)

Boobies and gannetsOrder: SuliformesFamily: Sulidae

The sulids comprise the gannets and boobies. Both groups are medium to large coastal seabirds that plunge-dive for fish.

 Gannet, Morus bassanus A

CormorantsOrder: SuliformesFamily: Phalacrocoracidae

Phalacrocoracidae is a family of medium to large coastal, fish-eating seabirds that includes cormorants and shags. Plumage coloration varies, with the majority having mainly dark plumage, some species being black-and-white, and a few being colorful.

 Cormorant, Phalacrocorax carbo 
 Shag, Gulosus aristotelis

Ibises and SpoonbillsOrder: PelecaniformesFamily: Threskiornithidae

Threskiornithidae is a family of large terrestrial and wading birds which includes the ibises and spoonbills. They have long, broad wings with 11 primary and about 20 secondary feathers. They are strong fliers and despite their size and weight, very capable soarers.

 Glossy ibis, Plegadis falcinellus A
 Spoonbill, Platalea leucorodia

Herons and bitternsOrder: PelecaniformesFamily: Ardeidae

The family Ardeidae contains the bitterns, herons and egrets. Herons and egrets are medium to large wading birds with long necks and legs. Bitterns tend to be shorter necked and more wary. Members of Ardeidae fly with their necks retracted, unlike other long-necked birds such as storks, ibises and spoonbills.

 Bittern, Botaurus stellaris 
 American bittern, Botaurus lentiginosus A
 Little bittern, Ixobrychus minutus A
 Least bittern, Ixobrychus exilis A
 Night-heron, Nycticorax nycticorax A
 Green heron, Butorides virescens A
 Squacco heron, Ardeola ralloides A
 Cattle egret, Bubulcus ibis A
 Grey heron, Ardea cinerea 
 Purple heron, Ardea purpurea A
 Great white egret, Ardea alba 
 Snowy egret, Egretta thula A
 Little egret, Egretta garzetta

OspreyOrder: AccipitriformesFamily: Pandionidae

The family Pandionidae contains only one species, the osprey. The osprey is a medium-large raptor which is a specialist fish-eater with a worldwide distribution.

Osprey, Pandion haliaetus

Hawks, eagles, and kitesOrder: AccipitriformesFamily: Accipitridae

Accipitridae is a family of birds of prey, which includes hawks, eagles, kites, harriers and Old World vultures. These birds have powerful hooked beaks for tearing flesh from their prey, strong legs, powerful talons and keen eyesight.

 Honey-buzzard, Pernis apivorus 
 Short-toed eagle, Circaetus gallicus A
 Golden eagle, Aquila chrysaetos 
 Sparrowhawk, Accipiter nisus A
 Goshawk, Accipiter gentilis 
 Marsh Harrier, Circus aeruginosus 
 Hen harrier Circus cyaneus 
 Pallid harrier Circus macrourus A
 Montagu's harrier Circus macrourus 
 Red kite, Milvus milvus 
 Black kite, Milvus migrans A
 White-tailed eagle, Haliaaetus albicilla A
 Rough-legged buzzard, Buteo lagopus 
 Buzzard, Buteo buteo 

Barn owlsOrder: StrigiformesFamily: Tytonidae

Barn owls are medium to large owls with large heads and characteristic heart-shaped faces. They have long strong legs with powerful talons.

Barn owl, Tyto alba

OwlsOrder: StrigiformesFamily: Strigidae

The typical owls are small to large solitary nocturnal birds of prey. They have large forward-facing eyes and ears, a hawk-like beak and a conspicuous circle of feathers around each eye called a facial disk.

 Tengmalm's owl, Aegolius funereus A
 Little owl, Athene noctua 
 Hawk owl, Surnia ulula A
 Scops owl, Otus scops A
 Long-eared owl, Asio otus 
 Short-eared owl, Asio flammeus 
 Snowy owl, Bubo scandiaca A
 Tawny owl, Strix aluco

HoopoesOrder: BucerotiformesFamily: Upupidae

Hoopoes have black, white and orangey-pink colouring with a large erectile crest on their head. 1 species occurs in Russia.

Hoopoe, Upupa epops

RollersOrder: CoraciiformesFamily: Coraciidae

Rollers resemble crows in size and build, but are more closely related to the kingfishers and bee-eaters. They share the colourful appearance of those groups with blues and browns predominating. The two inner front toes are connected, but the outer toe is not.

Roller, Coracias garrulus

KingfishersOrder: CoraciiformesFamily: Alcedinidae

Kingfishers are medium-sized birds with large heads, long, pointed bills, short legs and stubby tails. There are 5 species which occur in Russia.

Kingfisher, Alcedo atthis
Belted kingfisher, Megaceryle alcyon A

Bee-eatersOrder: CoraciiformesFamily: Meropidae

The bee-eaters are a group of near passerine birds in the family Meropidae. Most species are found in Africa but others occur in southern Europe, Madagascar, Australia and New Guinea. They are characterised by richly coloured plumage, slender bodies and usually elongated central tail feathers. All are colourful and have long downturned bills and pointed wings, which give them a swallow-like appearance when seen from afar.

Blue-cheeked bee-eater, Merops persicus A
Bee-eater, Merops apiaster

WoodpeckersOrder: PiciformesFamily: Picidae

Woodpeckers are small to medium-sized birds with chisel-like beaks, short legs, stiff tails and long tongues used for capturing insects. Some species have feet with two toes pointing forward and two backward, while several species have only three toes. Many woodpeckers have the habit of tapping noisily on tree trunks with their beaks.

Wryneck, Jynx torquilla
Lesser spotted woodpecker, Dryobates minor
Great spotted woodpecker, Dendrocopos major
Green woodpecker, Picus viridis

Falcons and caracarasOrder: FalconiformesFamily: Falconidae

Falconidae is a family of diurnal birds of prey. They differ from hawks, eagles and kites in that they kill with their beaks instead of their talons.

 Lesser kestrel, Falco naumanni A
 Kestrel, Falco tinnunculus 
 American kestrel, Falco sparverius A
 Red-footed falcon, Falco vespertinus A
 Eleonora's falcon, Falco eleonorae A
 Merlin, Falco columbarius 
 Hobby, Falco subbuteo 
 Gyr falcon, Falco rusticolus A
 Peregrine, Falco peregrinus

Tyrant flycatchersOrder: PasseriformesFamily: Tyrannidae

Tyrant flycatchers are Passerine birds which occur throughout North and South America. They superficially resemble the Old World flycatchers, but are more robust and have stronger bills. They do not have the sophisticated vocal capabilities of the songbirds. Most, but not all, are rather plain. As the name implies, most are insectivorous.

Yellow-bellied flycatcher, Empidonax flaviventris A
Eastern kingbird, Tyrannus tyrannus A

ShrikesOrder: PasseriformesFamily: Laniidae

Shrikes are passerine birds known for their habit of catching other birds and small animals and impaling the uneaten portions of their bodies on thorns. A typical shrike's beak is hooked, like a bird of prey.

Brown shrike, Lanius cristatus (A)
Red-backed shrike, Lanius collurio
Red-tailed shrike, Lanius phoenicuroides
Long-tailed shrike, Lanius schach (A)
Daurian shrike, Lanius isabellinus (A)
Lesser grey shrike, Lanius minor (A)
Great grey shrike, Lanius excubitor
Southern grey shrike, Lanius meridionalis  (A)
Woodchat shrike, Lanius senator 
Masked shrike, Lanius nubicus (A)

Vireos, shrike-babblers, and erpornisOrder: PasseriformesFamily: Vireonidae

The vireos are a group of small to medium-sized passerine birds. They are typically greenish in color and resemble wood warblers apart from their heavier bills.

Red-eyed vireo, Vireo olivaceus (A)

Old World oriolesOrder: PasseriformesFamily: Oriolidae

The Old World orioles are colourful passerine birds. They are not related to the New World orioles.

Golden oriole, Oriolus oriolus

Crows, jays, and magpiesOrder: PasseriformesFamily: Corvidae

The family Corvidae includes crows, ravens, jays, choughs, magpies, treepies, nutcrackers and ground jays. Corvids are above average in size among the Passeriformes, and some of the larger species show high levels of intelligence.

Jay, Garrulus glandarius
Magpie, Pica pica
Nutcracker, Nucifraga caryocatactes (A)
Chough, Corvus monedula
Jackdaw, Corvus monedula
Rook, Corvus frugilegus
Carrion crow, Corvus corone
Hooded crow, Corvus cornix
Raven, Corvus corax

WaxwingsOrder: PasseriformesFamily: Bombycillidae

The waxwings are a group of birds with soft silky plumage and unique red tips to some of the wing feathers. In the Bohemian and cedar waxwings, these tips look like sealing wax and give the group its name. These are arboreal birds of northern forests. They live on insects in summer and berries in winter.

Waxwing, Bombycilla garrulus
Cedar waxwing, Bombycilla cedrorum (A)

Tits, chickadees, and titmiceOrder: PasseriformesFamily: Paridae

The Paridae are mainly small stocky woodland species with short stout bills. Some have crests. They are adaptable birds, with a mixed diet including seeds and insects.

Coal tit, Periparus ater
Crested tit, Lophophanes cristatus
Marsh tit, Poecile palustris
Willow tit, Poecile montana
Blue tit, Cyanistes caeruleus
Great tit, Parus major

Bearded titOrder: PasseriformesFamily: Panuridae

This species, the only one in its family, is found in reed beds throughout temperate Europe and Asia.

 Bearded tit, Panurus biarmicus

LarksOrder: PasseriformesFamily: Alaudidae

Larks are small terrestrial birds with often extravagant songs and display flights. Most larks are fairly dull in appearance. Their food is insects and seeds.

Woodlark, Lullula arborea (A)
Skylark, Alauda arvensis
Crested lark, Galerida cristata (A)
Shore Lark, Eremophila alpestris
Short-toed lark, Calandrella brachydactyla 
Bimaculated lark, Melanocorypha bimaculata (A)
Calandra lark, Melanocorypha calandra (A)

SwallowsOrder: PasseriformesFamily: Hirundinidae

The family Hirundinidae is adapted to aerial feeding. They have a slender streamlined body, long pointed wings and a short bill with a wide gape. The feet are adapted to perching rather than walking, and the front toes are partially joined at the base.

Sand martin, Riparia riparia
Tree swallow, Tachycineta bicolor (A)
Purple martin, Progne subis (A)
Crag martin, Ptyonoprogne rupestris (A)
Swallow, Hirundo rustica
House martin, Delichon urbicum
Red-rumped swallow, Cecropis daurica (A)
American cliff swallow, Petrochelidon pyrrhonota (A)

Bush warblers and alliesOrder: PasseriformesFamily: Scotocercidae

The members of this family are found throughout Africa, Asia, and Polynesia. Their taxonomy is in flux, and some authorities place some genera in other families.

Cetti's warbler, Cettia cetti (A)

Long-tailed titsOrder: PasseriformesFamily: Aegithalidae

Long-tailed tits are a group of small passerine birds with medium to long tails. They make woven bag nests in trees. Most eat a mixed diet which includes insects.

Long-tailed tit, Aegithalos caudatus

Leaf warblersOrder: PasseriformesFamily: Phylloscopidae

Leaf warblers are a family of small insectivorous birds found mostly in Eurasia and ranging into Wallacea and Africa. The species are of various sizes, often green-plumaged above and yellow below, or more subdued with grayish-green to grayish-brown colors.

Wood warbler, Phylloscopus sibilatrix
Western Bonelli's warbler, Phylloscopus bonelli (A)
Eastern Bonelli's warbler, Phylloscopus orientalis (A)
Hume's warbler, Phylloscopus humei (A)
Yellow-browed warbler, Phylloscopus inornatus 
Pallas's warbler, Phylloscopus proregulus 
Radde's warbler, Phylloscopus schwarzi 
Dusky warbler, Phylloscopus fuscatus 
Willow warbler, Phylloscopus trochilus
Chiffchaff, Phylloscopus collybita
Iberian chiffchaff, Phylloscopus ibericus (A)
Green warbler, Phylloscopus nitidus (A)
Greenish warbler, Phylloscopus trochiloides (A)
Arctic warbler, Phylloscopus borealis (A)

Reed warblers and alliesOrder: PasseriformesFamily: Acrocephalidae

The members of this family are usually rather large for "warblers". Most are rather plain olivaceous brown above with much yellow to beige below. They are usually found in open woodland, reedbeds, or tall grass. The family occurs mostly in southern to western Eurasia and surroundings, but it also ranges far into the Pacific, with some species in Africa.

Great reed warbler, Acrocephalus arundinaceus (A)
Aquatic warbler, Acrocephalus paludicola
Sedge warbler, Acrocephalus schoenobaenus
Paddyfield warbler, Acrocephalus agricola (A)
Blyth's reed warbler, Acrocephalus dumetorum (A)
Reed warbler, Acrocephalus scirpaceus
Marsh warbler, Acrocephalus palustris
Thick-billed warbler, Iduna aedon
Booted warbler, Iduna caligata (A)
Sykes's warbler, Arundinax rama (A)
Eastern olivaceous warbler, Hippolais pallida (A)
Olive-tree warbler, Hippolais olivetorum (A)
Melodious warbler, Hippolais polyglotta
Icterine warbler, Hippolais icterina

Grassbirds and alliesOrder: PasseriformesFamily: Locustellidae

Locustellidae are a family of small insectivorous songbirds found mainly in Eurasia, Africa, and the Australian region. They are smallish birds with tails that are usually long and pointed, and tend to be drab brownish or buffy all over.

Pallas's grasshopper warbler, Locustella certhiola
Lanceolated warbler, Locustella lanceolata
River warbler, Locustella fluviatilis
Savi's warbler, Locustella luscinioides
Grasshopper warbler, Locustella naevia

Sylviid warblers, parrotbills, and alliesOrder: PasseriformesFamily: Sylviidae

The family Sylviidae is a group of small insectivorous passerine birds. They mainly occur as breeding species, as the common name implies, in Europe, Asia and, to a lesser extent, Africa. Most are of generally undistinguished appearance, but many have distinctive songs.

Blackcap, Sylvia atricapilla
Garden warbler, Sylvia borin
Barred warbler, Curruca nisoria
Lesser whitethroat, Curruca curruca
Western Orphean warbler, Curruca hortensis
Eastern Orphean warbler, Curruca crassirostris (A)
Rüppell's warbler, Curruca rueppelli
Sardinian warbler, Curruca melanocephala
Western subalpine warbler, Curruca iberiae
Eastern subalpine warbler, Curruca cantillans
Whitethroat, Curruca communis
Spectacled warbler, Curruca conspicillata (A)
Marmora's warbler, Curruca sarda (A)
Dartford warbler, Curruca undata

KingletsOrder: PasseriformesFamily: Regulidae

The kinglets, also called crests, are a small group of birds often included in the Old World warblers, but frequently given family status because they also resemble the titmice.

Firecrest, Regulus ignicapillus
Goldcrest, Regulus regulus

WrensOrder: PasseriformesFamily: Troglodytidae

The wrens are mainly small and inconspicuous except for their loud songs. These birds have short wings and thin down-turned bills. Several species often hold their tails upright. All are insectivorous.

Wren, Troglodytes troglodytes

NuthatchesOrder: PasseriformesFamily: Sittidae

Nuthatches are small woodland birds. They have the unusual ability to climb down trees head first, unlike other birds which can only go upwards. Nuthatches have big heads, short tails and powerful bills and feet.

Nuthatch, Sitta europaea

TreecreepersOrder: PasseriformesFamily: Certhiidae

Treecreepers are small woodland birds, brown above and white below. They have thin pointed down-curved bills, which they use to extricate insects from bark. They have stiff tail feathers, like woodpeckers, which they use to support themselves on vertical trees.

Treecreeper, Certhia familiaris

StarlingsOrder: PasseriformesFamily: Sturnidae

Starlings are small to medium-sized Old World passerine birds with strong feet. Their flight is strong and direct and most are very gregarious. Their preferred habitat is fairly open country, and they eat insects and fruit. The plumage of several species is dark with a metallic sheen.

Rose-coloured starling, Pastor roseus A
Starling, Sturnus vulgaris

Thrushes and alliesOrder: PasseriformesFamily: Turdidae

The thrushes are a group of passerine birds that occur mainly in the Old World. They are plump, soft plumaged, small to medium-sized insectivores or sometimes omnivores, often feeding on the ground. Many have attractive songs.

Varied thrush, Ixoreus naevius A
Swainson's thrush, Catharus ustulatus A
Hermit thrush, Catharus guttatus A
Grey-cheeked thrush, Catharus minimus A
Veery, Catharus fuscescens A
Siberian thrush, Geokichla sibirica A
Song thrush, Turdus philomelos
Mistle thrush, Turdus viscivorus
Redwing, Turdus iliacus
Blackbird, Turdus merula
Eyebrowed thrush, Turdus obscurus A
Fieldfare, Turdus pilaris
Ring ouzel, Turdus torquatus
Black-throated thrush, Turdus atrogularis
Red-throated thrush, Turdus ruficollis A
Dusky thrush, Turdus eunomus A
Naumann's thrush, Turdus naumanni A
American robin, Turdus migratorius A

Old World flycatchersOrder: PasseriformesFamily: Muscicapidae

Old World flycatchers are a large group of small passerine birds native to the Old World. They are mainly small arboreal insectivores. The appearance of these birds is highly varied, but they mostly have weak songs and harsh calls.

Spotted flycatcher, Muscicapa striata
Red-breasted flycatcher, Ficedula parva
Taiga flycatcher, Ficedula albicilla (A)
Collared flycatcher, Ficedula albicollis
Pied flycatcher, Ficedula hypoleuca
Robin, Erithacus rubecula
Siberian blue robin, Larvivora cyane (A)
Rufous-tailed robin, Larvivora sibilans (A)
Bluethroat, Luscinia svecica
Thrush nightingale, Luscinia luscinia (A)
Nightingale, Luscinia megarhynchos (A)
Siberian rubythroat, Calliope calliope (A)
Red-flanked bluetail, Tarsiger cyanurus (A)
Black redstart, Phoenicurus ochruros
Redstart, Phoenicurus phoenicurus
Rock thrush, Monticola saxatilis (A)
Blue rock thrush, Monticola solitarius (A)
Whinchat, Saxicola rubetra
Stonechat, Saxicola rubicola 
Wheatear, Oenanthe oenanthe
Isabelline wheatear, Oenanthe isabellina (A)
Desert wheatear, Oenanthe deserti (A)
Western black-eared wheatear, Oenanthe hispanica (A)
Eastern black-eared wheatear, Oenanthe melanoleuca (A)
Pied wheatear, Oenanthe pleschanka (A)
White-crowned black wheatear, Oenanthe leucopyga (A)

DippersOrder: PasseriformesFamily: Cinclidae

Dippers are a group of perching birds whose habitat includes aquatic environments in the Americas, Europe and Asia. They are named for their bobbing or dipping movements.

White-throated dipper, Cinclus cinclus

Old World sparrowsOrder: PasseriformesFamily: Passeridae

Old World sparrows are small passerine birds. In general, sparrows tend to be small, plump, brown or grey birds with short tails and short powerful beaks. Sparrows are seed eaters, but they also consume small insects.

Tree sparrow, Passer montanus
Spanish sparrow, Passer hispaniolensis A
House sparrow, Passer domesticus

AccentorsOrder: PasseriformesFamily: Prunellidae

The accentors are in the only bird family, Prunellidae, which is completely endemic to the Palearctic. They are small, fairly drab species superficially similar to sparrows.

Alpine accentor, Prunella collaris A
Dunnock, Prunella modularis

Wagtails and pipitsOrder: PasseriformesFamily: Motacillidae

Motacillidae is a family of small passerine birds with medium to long tails. They include the wagtails, longclaws and pipits. They are slender, ground feeding insectivores of open country.

Western yellow wagtail, Motacilla flava A
Citrine wagtail, Motacilla citreola A)
Grey wagtail, Motacilla cinerea 
Pied Wagtail, Motacilla alba
Richard's pipit, Anthus richardi
Blyth's pipit, Anthus godlewskii A
Tawny pipit, Anthus campestris
Meadow pipit, Anthus pratensis
Tree pipit, Anthus trivialis
Olive-backed pipit, Anthus hodgsoni A
Pechora pipit, Anthus gustavi A
Red-throated pipit, Anthus cervinus 
Buff-bellied pipit, Anthus rubescens A
Water pipit, Anthus spinoletta 
Rock pipit, Anthus petrosus

Finches, euphonias, and alliesOrder: PasseriformesFamily: Fringillidae

Finches are seed-eating passerine birds, that are small to moderately large and have a strong beak, usually conical and in some species very large. All have twelve tail feathers and nine primaries. These birds have a bouncing flight with alternating bouts of flapping and gliding on closed wings, and most sing well.

Chaffinch, Fringilla coelebs
Brambling, Fringilla montifringilla 
Evening grosbeak, Hesperiphona vespertina A
Hawfinch, Coccothraustes coccothraustes
Pine grosbeak, Pinicola enucleator A
Bullfinch, Pyrrhula pyrrhula
Trumpeter finch, Bucanetes githagineus A
Common rosefinch, Carpodacus erythrinus
Greenfinch, Chloris chloris
Twite, Linaria flavirostris 
Linnet, Linaria cannabina
Common redpoll, Acanthis flammea
Lesser redpoll, Acanthis cabaret
Arctic redpoll, Acanthis hornemanni A
Parrot crossbill, Loxia pytyopsittacus 
Scottish crossbill, Loxia scotica E
Crossbill, Loxia curvirostra
Two-barred crossbill, Loxia leucoptera A
Goldfinch, Carduelis carduelis
Serin, Serinus serinus
Siskin, Spinus spinus

Longspurs and arctic buntingsOrder: PasseriformesFamily: Calcariidae

The Calcariidae are a family of birds that had been traditionally grouped with the New World sparrows, but differ in a number of respects and are usually found in open grassy areas.

Lapland bunting, Calcarius lapponicus
Snow bunting, Plectrophenax nivalis

Old World buntingsOrder: PasseriformesFamily: Emberizidae

The emberizids are a large family of passerine birds. They are seed-eating birds with distinctively shaped bills. Many emberizid species have distinctive head patterns.

Corn bunting, Emberiza calandra 
Yellowhammer, Emberiza citrinella
Pine bunting, Emberiza leucocephalos A
Ortolan bunting, Emberiza hortulana
Cretzschmar's bunting, Emberiza caesia A
Cirl bunting, Emberiza cirlus
Little bunting, Emberiza pusilla 
Yellow-browed bunting, Emberiza chrysophrys A
Rustic bunting, Emberiza rustica 
Yellow-breasted bunting, Emberiza aureola A
Black-headed bunting, Emberiza melanocephala 
Black-faced bunting, Emberiza spodocephala
Pallas's reed bunting, Emberiza pallasi A
Reed bunting, Emberiza schoeniclus

New World sparrowsOrder: PasseriformesFamily: Passerellidae

Until 2017, these species were considered part of the family Emberizidae. Most of the species are known as sparrows, but these birds are not closely related to the Old World sparrows which are in the family Passeridae. Many of these have distinctive head patterns.

Dark-eyed junco, Junco hyemalis A
White-crowned sparrow, Zonotrichia leucophrys A
White-throated sparrow, Zonotrichia albicollis A
Savannah sparrow, Passerculus sandwichensis A
Song sparrow, Melospiza melodia A

Troupials and alliesOrder: PasseriformesFamily: Icteridae

The icterids are a group of small to medium-sized, often colorful passerine birds restricted to the New World and include the grackles, New World blackbirds, and New World orioles. Most species have black as a predominant plumage color, often enlivened by yellow, orange, or red.

Bobolink, Dolichonyx oryzivorus A
Baltimore oriole, Icterus galbula A
Brown-headed cowbird, Molothrus ater A

New World warblersOrder: PasseriformesFamily: Parulidae

The wood-warblers are a group of small often colorful passerine birds restricted to the New World. Most are arboreal, but some are more terrestrial. Most members of this family are insectivores.

Ovenbird, Seiurus aurocapilla A
Black-and-white warbler, Mniotilta varia A
Tennessee warbler, Leiothlypis peregrina A
Common yellowthroat, Geothlypis trichas A
Hooded warbler, Setophaga citrina A
American redstart, Setophaga ruticilla A
Cape May warbler, Setophaga tigrina A
Northern parula, Setophaga americana A
Magnolia warbler, Setophaga magnolia A
Blackburnian warbler, Setophaga fusca A
Yellow warbler, Setophaga petechia A
Chestnut-sided warbler, Setophaga pensylvanica A
Blackpoll warbler, Setophaga striata A
Yellow-rumped warbler, Setophaga coronata A
Wilson's warbler, Cardellina pusilla

Cardinals and alliesOrder: PasseriformesFamily''': Cardinalidae

The cardinals are a family of robust, seed-eating birds with strong bills. They are typically associated with open woodland. The sexes usually have distinct plumages.

Scarlet tanager, Piranga olivacea A
Rose-breasted grosbeak, Pheucticus ludovicianus A
Indigo bunting, Passerina cyanea A

See also
List of birds
Lists of birds by region

References

British Ornithologists' Union (2021) . Accessed 22/11/21.
 The Scottish List Species and subspecies: A checklist of the birds of Scotland (2021) ''. Accessed 22/11/21.

Fauna of Scotland
Scotland-related lists
Scotland
'Scotland